Ridgway's rail (Rallus obsoletus) is a near-threatened species of bird. It is found principally along the Pacific Coast of North America from the San Francisco Bay Area to southern Baja California, as well as in some regions of the Gulf of California. A member of the rail family, Rallidae, it is a chicken-sized bird that rarely flies. Its common name and Latin binomial commemorate American ornithologist Robert Ridgway.

This species is closely related to the clapper rail, and until recently was considered a subspecies. It has a long, downward curving bill and is grayish brown with a pale chestnut breast and conspicuous whitish rump patch. The population levels of Ridgway's rail are low due to destruction of its coastal and estuarine marshland habitat by prior land development and shoreline fill. It has year-long, circadian activity and is most vocal nocturnally and crepuscularly.

Ridgway's rail pertains to the Rallidae family within order Gruiformes. The California subspecies naturally exists in tidal salt and brackish marshes. These ecosystems are subjected to freely flowing daily tidal flows, a sustainable amount of prey food supply consisting of invertebrates, advanced tidal waterway systems, and apt nesting areas and covered spaces that serve as protection during high tides.

The species was officially named by ornithologist James Maley after the renowned ornithologist Robert Ridgway.

Habitat

Ridgway's rail forages at the upper end of, along the ecotone between mudflat and higher vegetated zones, and in tidal sloughs. Mussels, clams, arthropods, snails, worms and small fish are its preferred foods, which it retrieves by probing and scavenging the surface while walking. The bird will only forage on mudflats or very shallow water where there is taller plant material nearby to provide protection at high tide. At such high tides it may also prey upon mice, and has been known to scavenge dead fish.

One of the largest population of Ridgway's rails is in San Francisco Bay, where a total of about 1100 are resident. In the past, however, its geographic range spanned more than 90% of the range of the San Francisco Bay.  Other frequent sightings of this species around the San Francisco Bay include the Napa Sonoma Marsh, Bothin Marsh in Mill Valley, Gallinas Creek in San Rafael, Arrowhead Marsh and Damon Marsh in Oakland, the  Palo Alto baylands, Charleston Slough in Mountain View, Seal Slough in San Mateo and Belmont Slough.

For cover, Ridgway's rail seeks out emergent wetland dominated by pickleweed and cordgrass, or brackish emergent wetland with those two plants plus bulrush. It is not clear whether it requires any source of fresh water. Although not migratory in coastal wetlands, this species disperses juveniles into freshwater wetlands in late August through October. Ridgway's rail has been observed to forage in or near relatively disturbed areas, leading one to deduce the importance of protecting even numeral marsh areas; for example this species was seen foraging in a small mudflat area within Seal Slough in San Mateo, three miles from the nearest known breeding area in Belmont.

Feeding and ecology
The omnivorous Ridgway's rail eats many things, including clams, crabs, mussels, and occasionally small rodents and birds.

Breeding
By mid-February, nest building has begun. Ridgway's rail then breeds (California rail subspecies) in the San Francisco Bay from mid-March through August, with peak activity in late June. During this breeding season the bird density was approximately 0.1 to 0.6 individuals per acre; outside of breeding season densities decline to 0.04 to 0.40 individuals per acre. The twig nest is placed low, sometimes among plant roots, and purple-spotted buff eggs are laid. Eggs are produced in clutches of four to fourteen, with an average yield of 7.6. The incubation period is 18 to 29 days, and the hatching success is 38%, notably less than the similar light-footed rail indigenous to southern California. Incubation is shared between both the male and female Ridgway's rail.

Subspecies
R. o. obsoletus, formerly California clapper rail, nominate subspecies 
R. o. levipes, light-footed rail, a U.S. federal and California state listed endangered subspecies that ranges from Santa Barbara County to the extreme north of the Mexican coast of the Pacific Ocean. 
R. o. yumanensis, Yuma rail, southeastern California and southern Arizona, to northwestern Mexico
R. o. beldingi, Belding's rail, southern Baja California

References

External links 
 

Birds described in 1874
Endemic fauna of California
Fauna of the San Francisco Bay Area
Native birds of the West Coast of the United States
Natural history of San Mateo County, California
Near threatened animals
Rigway's rail
San Francisco Bay
Taxa named by Robert Ridgway